Daozhen Gelao and Miao Autonomous County (usually referred to as "Daozhen County", is a county in northernmost Guizhou province, China. It is under the administration of the prefecture-level city of Zunyi. Daozhen Gelao and Miao Autonomous County is surrounded by Chongqing on the north, Zheng'an County on the southwest, and Wuchuan Gelao and Miao Autonomous County on the southeast. The county has one subdistrict, eleven towns, one ethnic township and two townships under its jurisdiction, the county seat is Yinzhen Subdistrict.

Etymology
The name of "Yinzhen" is named after the courtesy name "Daozhen" of Yin Zhen, a Confucian scholar who lived during the Eastern Han dynasty (25–220) and was one of "Three Sages of Han in Guizhou", the other two were She Ren and Sheng Lan.

History
After conquering all the states, Emperor Qin Shi Huang implemented the system of prefectures and counties in 221 BC. Daozhen Gelao and Miao Autonomous County came under the jurisdiction of Ba Commandery.

In the Western Han dynasty (206 BC–8 AD), it belonged to Fuling County.

In 221, the county under the control of Shu Han  (221–263).

After the Disaster of Yongjia in 311, local ethnic groups resisted full subjugation and the central government lost its jurisdiction.

In 564, Feng Zhou was formed after the native ruler Tian Sihe made agreements with the Northern Zhou Empire (557–581). Ten years later it was renamed "Qian Zhou".

After China was reunified during the Sui dynasty (589–618), Xin'an County was formed and under the administration of Mingyang Commandery.

Under the Tang dynasty (618–907), its name was replaced by "Xinning County" and under the administration of Yi Zhou. It came under the jurisdiction of Qian Zhou in 673, Zhen Zhou in 642 and later Zhen Zhou in 807. After the fall of Tang dynasty, the central government lost its jurisdiction again.

In 965, the native leader Tian Jingqian paid allegiance to the Emperor Taizong, who declared the new Qiande period of the Song dynasty (960–1279) five years ago. Its name was changed to Gao Zhou in 968 and restored the former name "Zhen Zhou" in 1108. In 1274, it was under jurisdiction of Bo Zhou.

In 1363, Ming Yuzhen founded the Ming Xia in southwest China during the chaotic late Yuan dynasty (1271–1368), the name was changed to "Zhen Zhou".

In 1372, Yang Keng, the top local official, paid allegiance to Hongwu Emperor, who set up the Ming dynasty (1368–1644) four years ago. It came under the jurisdiction of Sichuan Buzhengshisi and later Guizhou Buzhengshisi in 1382. In 1600, local government known as "Bozhou Xuanweisi" rose in rebellion against the central government. Wanli Emperor sent troops to pacify the rebellion. Zhen'an Zhou was split from "Bozhou Xuanweisi" after the rebellion was suppressed.

In 1724, in the ruling of Yongzheng Emperor of the Qing dynasty (1644–1911), it was renamed "Zheng'an Zhou".

In July 1914, Zheng'an Zhou was revoked and Daozhen County was set up.

On December 21, 1949, the Communists took over Daozhen County. It came under the jurisdiction of Zunyi Special District. In December 1958, Daozhen County was revoked and merged into Zheng'an County. Daozhen County was restored in August 1961. In November 1987 it became an autonomous county known as "Daozhen Gelao and Miao Autonomous County" approved by the State Council of China.

Administrative division
As of January 2016, Daozhen Gelao and Miao Autonomous County has one subdistrict, eleven towns, one ethnic township and two townships under its jurisdiction. The county seat is Yinzhen Subdistrict.

Geography
Daozhen Gelao and Miao Autonomous County is located in northern Guizhou province. Daozhen Gelao and Miao Autonomous County shares a border with Chongqing on the north, Zheng'an County on the southwest, and Wuchuan Gelao and Miao Autonomous County on the southeast.

Climate

Rivers
There are 45 rivers and streams in the county. The major rivers are Furong River, Mei River, Sanjiang River, and Luolong River.

Mountains

Natural resources
Daozhen Gelao and Miao Autonomous County is rich in natural resources. There are nearly 20 kinds of mineral resources, such as coal, oil shale, aluminium, iron, lead, zinc, silver, gypsum, calcite, etc. Coal reserves reached 116 million tons, making it became one of the "four coal fields in Zunyi".

Fauna
There are more than 400 species of terrestrial vertebrates in Daozhen Gelao and Miao Autonomous County. Among them, there are four kinds of national first-class protected wild animals, including françois' langur, musk deer, leopard, and clouded leopard, and more than 30 kinds of national second-class protected wild animals, such as macaque, Tibetan macaque, large Indian civet, pangolin and golden pheasant.

Flora
Daozhen Gelao and Miao Autonomous County has more than 100 species of wild plants of which 30 have state protection, such as Cathaya, Davidia involucrata, Ginkgo biloba, Taxus chinensis, Cunninghamia lanceolata, Cinnamomum camphora, etc.

Demographics

Population
As of 2018, there were 352,149 people, including 234,678 rural population and 117,471 urban population.

Language
Mandarin is the official language.

Religion
The Gelao and Miao people believe in animism and worship ancestors. Buddhism and Taoism was introduced into Daozhen Gelao and Miao Autonomous County after the conquest of Song dynasty (960–1279).

Tourism
Daozhen Gelao and Miao Autonomous County touts many attractions, including the Fairy Cave, Dashahe Provincial Nature Reserve and Luolong National Ecological Park.

Notable people
 Liu Jiahua, politician. 
 Xiong Xianyu, PLA military officer.

References

Bibliography

External links

County-level divisions of Guizhou
Gelao autonomous counties
Miao autonomous counties
Administrative divisions of Zunyi